Gary Gill may refer to:

Gary Gill (born 1964), English footballer
Gary Gill (politician), Honolulu City Council Member from 1987 to 1994
Gary Gill, Natural Law candidate in the Washington secretary of state election, 1996
Gary P. Gill, Natural Law candidate in 1992 for Twickenham (UK Parliament constituency)